Orletskoye is a rural locality (a selo) in Sadovsky Selsoviet of Tambovsky District, Amur Oblast, Russia. The population was 212 as of 2018. There are 4 streets.

Geography 
Orletskoye is located 15 km north of Tambovka (the district's administrative centre) by road. Uspenovka is the nearest rural locality.

References 

Rural localities in Tambovsky District, Amur Oblast